Bobrava is a rural locality (a selo) and the administrative center of Bobravskoye Rural Settlement, Rakityansky District, Belgorod Oblast, Russia. The population was 1,419 as of 2010. There are 10 streets.

Geography 
Bobrava is located 17 km north of Rakitnoye (the district's administrative centre) by road. Novozakharovka is the nearest rural locality.

References 

Rural localities in Rakityansky District